Helen Thom Edwards (May 27, 1936 – June 21, 2016) was an American physicist. She was the lead scientist for the design and construction of the Tevatron at the Fermi National Accelerator Laboratory.

Career
Edwards was best known for leadership in the design, construction, commissioning and operation of the Tevatron, which for 25 years was the most powerful particle collider in the world. Tevatron recorded its first proton-antiproton collisions in 1985 and was used to find the top quark in 1995 and the tau neutrino in 2000, two of the three fundamental particles discovered at Fermilab. Between 1989 and 1992, Edwards was also deeply involved in the eventually abandoned project of the Superconducting Super Collider in Texas.

After 1992, Edwards made significant contributions to the development of high-gradient, superconducting linear accelerators as well as bright and intense electron sources. She played a key role working with scientists at DESY developing superconducting accelerator technology. She led a Fermilab group collaborating with DESY in the 1990s and built the photoinjector for the TESLA Test Facility at the German laboratory. Fermilab has since developed superconducting accelerator technology to the point that it is the enabling technology behind its future proton accelerators.

Education
Edwards attended The Madeira School, finishing in 1953, and Cornell University from 1957, with her final graduation in 1966 - she earned a bachelor's degree in physics from Cornell University, and continued studying there, going on to her M.S. degree in the physics department under Kenneth Greisen, working with the development of electromagnetic showers, and then earning her PhD from Cornell in 1966, working under the direction of Boyce McDaniel in the Laboratory of Nuclear Studies.

Positions
After earning her PhD at Cornell in 1966, Edwards continued her work in Nuclear Studies at Cornell as a research associate at the 10 GEV Electron Synchrotron  under the supervision of Robert R. Wilson. Edwards then joined Wilson when he transitioned to Fermi National Accelerator Laboratory in 1970.

When she first began her work at Fermilab, she was put in charge of the accelerator division. In her most well-known work, she oversaw the building of the Tevatron, one of the highest energy super-conducting particle accelerators ever constructed. Her work was supervised by Leon M. Lederman.

1966-70 Research Associate, 10 GEV Electron Synchrotron, Cornell University
1970-87 Associate Head of the Booster Group, Fermi National Accelerator Laboratory
1987-89 Head, Accelerator Division, Fermi National Accelerator Laboratory
1989-92 Head & Associate Director, Superconducting Division, Superconducting Super Collider Laboratory, Dallas
1988 MacArthur Fellow
1992–2010 Guest Scientist, Fermi National Accelerator Laboratory

It was said of her that "She knew how to bring the right people together to carry out a project and how to encourage them to success.  In private life, she was a nature lover and is remembered as a very gentle and caring person."

Awards and honors
Robert R. Wilson Prize for Achievement in the Physics of Particle Accelerators Recipient from the American Physical Society (2003)
USPAS Prize for Achievement in Accelerator Physics and Technology 1985
E. O. Lawrence Award, U.S. Department of Energy 1986
MacArthur Foundation Fellowship 1988
 Elected to the National Academy of Engineering (1988)
National Medal of Technology 1989

References

Further reading

Link to image of Helen T. Edwards

1936 births
2016 deaths
American women physicists
American women engineers
MacArthur Fellows
National Medal of Technology recipients
Members of the United States National Academy of Engineering
People associated with Fermilab
Cornell University alumni
Madeira School alumni
21st-century American physicists
20th-century American physicists
21st-century women engineers
20th-century women engineers
20th-century American women scientists
21st-century American women scientists